Voroshilovsky (masculine), Voroshilovskaya (feminine), or Voroshilovskoye (neuter) is the name of several rural localities in Russia:

Voroshilovsky (rural locality), a settlement in Kopenkinskoye Rural Settlement of Rossoshansky District of Voronezh Oblast
Voroshilovskoye, Russia, a village in Kaltovsky Selsoviet of Iglinsky District of the Republic of Bashkortostan